New Zealand Association of Rationalists and Humanists (or NZARH) was established in Auckland, New Zealand, in 1927. The Association promotes rationalism and secular humanism.

The principal aims are stated as:
 To advocate a rational, humane, and secular view of life without reference to supernatural agencies and which is compatible with the scientific method.
 To promote a tolerant, responsible, and open society.
 To encourage open-minded enquiry into matters relevant to human co-existence and well-being.

NZARH is an associate member of the International Humanist and Ethical Union.

IHEU's Minimum statement on Humanism
All member organisations of the IHEU are required by IHEU bylaw 5.1 to accept  the IHEU Minimum statement on Humanism:

Humanism is a democratic and ethical life stance, which affirms that human beings have the right and responsibility to give meaning and shape to their own lives. It stands for the building of a more humane society through an ethic based on human and other natural values in the spirit of reason and free inquiry through human capabilities. It is not theistic, and it does not accept supernatural views of reality.

Awards
In 2000, NZARH was awarded a Bravo award by the New Zealand Skeptics for "issuing a challenge to visiting Australian Ellen Greve, aka Jasmuheen, who claims to survive by breathing air and eating nothing."

See also
Humanist Society of New Zealand

References

External links

New Zealand
Society of New Zealand
Skeptic organisations in New Zealand
Secularism in New Zealand